Beatus Rhenanus (22 August 148520 July 1547), born as Beatus Bild, was a German humanist, religious reformer, classical scholar, and book collector.

Early life and education 
Rhenanus was born on the 22 August 1485 in Schlettstadt (Sélestat) in Alsace. He was the third of three brothers. His father, Anton Bild, was a butcher from Rhinau (the source of his name "Rhenanus", which Beatus Latinised from his father, who was known as the "Rhinauer", the "man from Rheinau"). His grandfather Eberhard emigrated to Schlettstadt from Rheinau, and his son Anton was a member of the local council and acted as Schlettstadts Mayor between 1495-1512. Beatus lost his mother Barbara Kegler at the age of three and was raised by his father and his uncle Reinhart Kegler, a priest. His father would not remarry and focused in the education of his only surviving son. He was able to provide his son with an excellent education Between 1491 and 1503 Rhenanus attended the Latin school of Schlettstadt.

Paris 
On the 25 April 1503, Rhenanus left Schlettstadt for Paris where he arrived on the 9 May 1503. In Paris he entered the College du Cardinal Lemoine, where he came under the influence of Jacobus Lefèvre Stapulensis, an eminent Aristotelian. He assisted Lefèvre in publishing a commented Politika and a treatise on the Nicomachean Ethics by Aristotle in the print of Henri Estienne. After having graduated he returned to Schlettstadt in 1507.

Strasbourg 
In the same year he moved to Strassburg (Strasbourg), where he worked for the printer Mathias Schurer and made the acquaintance of the great Alsatian humanists, including Jakob Wimpfeling, Johann Geiler von Kaisersberg and Sebastian Brant. The works he was involved at Schurer were poems and treatises by contemporary Italian humanists and are seen as a preparation for his later work on texts by Aristotle and the Fathers of the Church. One was a book by Fausto Anderlini, who was a teacher of his in Paris.

Basel 
After having also evaluated Orleans for his further studies, he eventually chose to come to Basel in July 1511. He sought to become a student of the teacher in the Greek language Johannes Cuno. Rhenanus would become the favorite student of Cuno, who would bequest him with his library. The 1512 edition of the Decretum Gratiani from the printers Johann Amerbach, Johan Petri and Johann Froben is the first known book he edited in Basel. In Basel he also befriended Desiderius Erasmus and played an active role in the publishing enterprises of Johann Froben. While he was staying in Basel, he usually lived several months a year in Schlettstadt. In 1519/1520, when the plague raged in Basel, he stayed in Schlettstadt for over twelve months.

Schlettstadt 
He returned to Schlettstadt in 1528 to devote himself to a life of learned leisure. In the early 1530s he edited works of the roman historians Tacitus and Livy. The Tacitus was published in 1533 by Froben in Basel. He continued a lively correspondence with many contemporary scholars, including his friend Erasmus, and supervised the printing of many of Erasmus's most important works.

Legacy 
Rhenanus's own publications include a biography of Johann Geiler von Kaisersberg (1510), the Rerum Germanicarum Libri III (1531), and editions of Velleius Paterculus (Froben, Basel, 1520), based on the sole surviving manuscript, which he discovered in the Benedictine monastery at Murbach, Alsace. He also wrote works on Tacitus (1519), Livy (1522), and a nine-volume work on his friend Erasmus (1540-1541).

Beatus Rhenanus invaluable collection of books went into the ownership of his hometown by his death and is still to be seen in its entirety in the Humanist Library of Sélestat. Four year after his death, Johannes Sturm wrote a biography on him.

Personal life 
He had two elder brothers, both of which died during childhood. His mother died when he was three years of age. He died on the way from Strasbourg on the 20 July 1547 while still in hope for a treatment for a sickness.

Notes

External links
https://web.archive.org/web/20120211132805/http://www.uni-giessen.de/gloning/at/beatus-rhenanus_1531_rerum-germanicarum-libri-tres.pdf

1485 births
1547 deaths
People from Sélestat
German Renaissance humanists
Book and manuscript collectors
German male writers